= Malado Anido =

Bissau-Guinean professional footballer

Personal information
- Full name: Malado Reld Anido
- Place of birth: Guinea-Bissau
- Position: Defender

International career^{‡}
Years	Team	Apps	(Gls)
2015–	Guinea-Bissau	1	(1)
- ‡ National team caps and goals as of 15:01, 14 October 2015 (UTC)

Malado Reld Anido is a Bissau-Guinean professional footballer who plays as a defender.
